Group 9 is a rugby league competition based in Wagga Wagga, New South Wales, Australia, and surrounding areas. The competition is played in five grades, with these being Under 17s, Under 19s, Women's League-Tag, Reserve-Grade and First-Grade.

Currently a home and away season consisting of sixteen rounds is played. The best four teams then play-off according to the Page–McIntyre system, culminating in the Group 9 Grand final, which is traditionally held at McDonald's Park in Wagga Wagga.

History

1920s-1950s: Foundations
Group 9 Rugby League was formed at a meeting at the Grand Hotel, Harden, following a four-hour meeting on 26 April 1923, which finished at 12:20 am the following morning. The foundation clubs were Harden, Murrumburrah, Binalong, Young, Wambanumba, Monteagle, Bendick Murrell, Cootamundra, Junee, Wagga Wagga, Gundagai, Tumut, Adelong, West Wyalong, Barmedman, Griffith, Temora, Leeton, Ariah Park and Mildil.

Competition in the early years of Group 9 consisted of various challenge type matches, and it was not until 1933 that regular inter-club competition commenced.

1960s-1980s: Murrumbidgee Breakaway and Reformation

In 1966, the rebel Murrumbidgee Rugby League broke away from the competition, leading to four years of reshuffled boundaries from 1967 to 1970. New competitions formed were the Murrumbidgee Rugby League, Group 8/9, Group 9/20 and Riverina Zone 3. Temora and West Wyalong joined the Group 20 Rugby League during this period, leading to the 9/20 name, while other Group 9 clubs played in the Group 8/9 competition.

In 1970, when the Group 9 and 20 competitions regained control of football in the district, West Wyalong remained in Group 20, while Temora returned and the Wagga Magpies and Kangaroos joined from Group 20.

1990s-present: Absorption of Group 13 and Decline

After the Group 13 Rugby League competition collapsed in 1991, the Albury Blues (renamed Greater Southern Rams upon entry due to Tumut already being the Blues), Wagga Brothers, a merged outfit from Adelong and Batlow, and Tumbarumba, joined the competition.

However, the competition declined from a peak of 14 clubs in the late 1990s to 9 clubs in 2022. Clubs to leave in this period included Adelong-Batlow (folded), Harden-Murrumburrah (George Tooke Shield), Tumbarumba (folded, then joined Murray Cup) and Cootamundra (George Tooke Shield). Turvey Park and Wagga Magpies also merged in 2005 to form the South City Bulls.

Albury Thunder, the successor to Greater Southern Rams and Lavington Panthers, won a threepeat of titles from 2012 to 2014.

Group 9's crisis became even more apparent following powerhouse Junee's decision not to field a First Grade team in 2021 and 2022. However, this strategy paid off as the club won the Reserve Grade title in 2022, with plans to return to First Grade football in 2023. Their return to the premier grade was offset by the loss of the Wagga Brothers to the exact same fate for the 2023 season.

Current clubs

Previous clubs

First Grade Grand Finals

Team Performance

Reserve Grade Grand Finals

Team Performance

Under 18/19s Grand Finals 
Group Nine has run two under-age competitions since 1971. Clubs in the older division compete for the Weissel Cup. This is not to be confused with the Weissel Medal, an award for the First Grade Player of the Year. Both awards are named in honour of the late Eric Weissel, an Australian representative who played and coached several clubs in the region.

Team Performance

Under 16/17s Grand Finals

Team Performance

Ladies League Tag Grand Finals

Team Performance

Juniors

Junior League Clubs

The following clubs participate in the Group 9 Junior Rugby League competition. Where applicable, the club's differing senior team or competition is listed in brackets.
 Albury Thunder JRL
 Cootamundra Bulldogs (George Tooke Shield)
 Gundagai-Adelong Tigers JRL
 Harden-Boorowa (George Tooke Shield)
 Junee Diesels JRL
 Temora Dragons JRL
 Tumbarumba-Batlow Minor League (Murray)
 Tumut Minor League
 Turvey Park Lions (South City Bulls)
 Wagga Wagga Brothers JRL
 Wagga Wagga Kangaroos JRL
 Wagga Wagga Magpies (South City Bulls)
 Young Cherrypickers JRL

Notable Group 9 Juniors
Albury Thunder
Adrian Purtell
Cootamundra Bulldogs
Mark Bryant
Les Boyd
Glen Buttriss
Jack De Belin
Paul Beath
Luke Berkrey
Dennis Luck
Junee Diesels
Laurie Daley
Jason Lidden
Rick Keast
Adam Perry
Michael Dobson
Craig Breen
Phil Crowe
South City Bulls (Turvey Park/Wagga Magpies
Nick Skinner
Temora Dragons
Mark Stimson
Trent Barrett
Todd Payten
Josh McCrone
Steve Reardon
Ryan Hinchcliffe
Mark Nicholls
Ben Hampton
Trevor Barnes
Brendon Reeves
Peter Stimson
Gavin Price-Jones
Steve Reardon
Joe Stimson
Liam Martin
Zac Lomax
Wagga Wagga Brothers
Jack Littlejohn

Wagga Wagga Kangaroos
Peter Sterling
Steve Mortimer
John Bush
Steve Martin
Greg Watt
Geoff Lawson
Jeff Case
Paul Upfield
Marc Glanville
Luke Priddis
Jamie Soward
Nigel Plum
Cameron King
Young Cherrypickers
Rod Slater
Peter Spring
Brett Mullins
Simon Woolford
Jordan McLean
Angus Crichton
Brett Hetherington
Luke Davico
Ron Lynch
Peter Spring
Peter Cusack

See also

Rugby League Competitions in Australia

References

External links 
 Group 9 Homepage

Sport in Wagga Wagga
Rugby league competitions in New South Wales